The 1954–55 Soviet Cup was the fifth edition of the Soviet Cup ice hockey tournament.

21 teams participated in the tournament, which was won by CDSA Moscow for the second consecutive season.

Tournament

First round

Second round

1/8 finals

Quarterfinals

Semifinals

Final

External links
 Season on hockeyarchives.info
 Season on hockeyarchives.ru

Cup
Soviet Cup (ice hockey) seasons